Lo Esencial De Ricardo Arjona is a compilation album released on 2010 by Guatemalan singer-songwriter Ricardo Arjona.

The album is a compilation of 45 songs from Arjona's previous works.

Also, the album includes some of those hits recorded live, and new versions with artists like Puerto Rican pop singer Marc Anthony and salsa singer Gilberto Santa Rosa.

Track listing 
CD/DVD edition track list:

References

External links 
 http://www.ricardoarjona.com/

2010 compilation albums
Ricardo Arjona compilation albums
Spanish-language compilation albums